Charles Sumner Eastman (January 23, 1864 – August 26, 1939) was an American politician and lawyer who served as a member of the South Dakota House of Representatives. Eastman was a member of the La Follette family, a prominent political family in Wisconsin.

Early life and education
Born in Primrose, Wisconsin, Eastman was educated in the Dane County public schools and at the Northwestern Business College.

Career 
In 1882, he moved to Dakota Territory and settled in Plankinton, Dakota Territory. In 1888, he was admitted to the Dakota Territory bar and practiced law in what is now Hot Springs, South Dakota and was senior member of Eastman & Dudley Law Firm. He served as county judge of Fall River County, South Dakota from 1887 to 1889 and then was deputy sheriff and sheriff of Fall River County from 1892 to 1897. He served as a Democrat in the South Dakota House of Representatives from 1907 to 1908.

Personal life 
His uncle was Robert M. La Follette, who served as a member of the United States Senate. Philip La Follette, Robert M. La Follette Jr., and Fola La Follette were Eastman's first cousins. Eastman died in Hot Springs, South Dakota.

References

External links

1864 births
1939 deaths
People from Primrose, Wisconsin
People from Hot Springs, South Dakota
La Follette family
Madison Business College alumni
South Dakota lawyers
South Dakota state court judges
Democratic Party members of the South Dakota House of Representatives
South Dakota sheriffs
People from Aurora County, South Dakota